Jan Herman van Roijen (10 April 1905 – 16 March 1991) was a Dutch diplomat and politician. He was Dutch foreign minister in 1946.

Early life
Van Roijen was born in Constantinople on 10 April 1905.  He was the son of Jan Herman van Roijen Sr (1871–1933) and the American-born Albertina Taylor Winthrop (1871–1934), who married in May 1904. When he was born, his father was a diplomat in Constantinople.

His maternal grandparents were banker Robert Winthrop and the former Kate Wilson Taylor (a daughter of Moses Taylor, a prominent railroad financier who served as president of National City Bank). Among his maternal family was uncle Beekman Winthrop, the Assistant Secretary of the Navy in the Taft Administration, and aunt Katharine Taylor Winthrop, the wife of U.S. Senator Hamilton Fish Kean.

He received a Ph.D. from the University of Utrecht.

Career

Van Roijen's diplomatic career began in the 1930s when he joined the Dutch Ministry of Foreign Affairs in 1930 and was an attache in Washington for three years. He also held positions in embassies in Tokyo as well as positions at the Ministry of Foreign Affairs in the Hague.  In 1939, he was named head of the political division at the ministry.

Following the war, he represented the Netherlands at various conferences linked to the nascent United Nations, including the United Nations Conference on International Organization in San Francisco.

After his brief stint as the Dutch foreign minister, he was the ambassador to Canada (1947–1950), to the United States (1950–1964), and jointly to the United Kingdom and to Iceland (1964–1970).

Awards
In 1982 he received the inaugural Freedom from Fear Award and in 1984 he received the Wateler Peace Prize for his diplomatic efforts.

He received an Honorary Doctor of Civil Law from The University of Toledo on June 8, 1957.

Personal life

Van Roijen was married to Anne Snouck Hurgronje, a daughter of Aarnout Marinus Snouck Hurgronje.  Together, they were the parents of two sons, Jan Herman and Willem, and two daughters, Tina van Notten and Digna van Karnebeek.  While in America, they owned a 300-acre farm in Warrenton, Virginia.

He died, aged eighty-five, on 16 March 1991 at Wassenaar in South Holland.

References

External links

 

1905 births
1991 deaths
Ministers of Foreign Affairs of the Netherlands
Ministers without portfolio of the Netherlands
Ambassadors of the Netherlands to Canada
Ambassadors of the Netherlands to the United States
Ambassadors of the Netherlands to the United Kingdom
Ambassadors of the Netherlands to Iceland
Dutch jurists
Dutch people of American descent
Dutch people of English descent
People from Leiden
Utrecht University alumni
Independent politicians in the Netherlands
Commanders of the Order of the Netherlands Lion
Knights Grand Cross of the Order of Orange-Nassau
Recipients of the Four Freedoms Award
Dutch expatriates in the Ottoman Empire